A Time and a Place is a box set by Emerson, Lake & Palmer. It was released in 2010. The box set takes its name from the band's 1971 song "A Time and a Place".

Background
The set brings together a select body of live performances captured before worldwide audiences during the band's career and tenure at the sharp end of the Progressive rock genre. It features high-quality soundboard recordings on the first three discs and audience recordings on the fourth. The collection has been praised by fans and in album reviews for the quality of the soundboard recordings, as well as the vast diversity of tracks featured on the discs. This collection is a part of a series of "official" bootleg releases by Shout! Factory and producer David Skye, with the blessing and participation of artists to provide fans with only the best performances, highest quality recordings, superior packaging and with original cover artwork designed by illustrator William Stout, internationally renowned as one of the first rock "n" roll bootleg cover artists. Other releases in the series include Iggy Pop's Roadkill Rising and Todd Rundgren's For Lack of Honest Work.

Track listing

Disc 1 (The Early '70s)
"The Barbarian (Isle of Wight Festival, Isle of Wight, England UK, 29 August 1970)
"Take a Pebble" (Beat-Club, Bremen, Germany, 26 November 1970)
"Ballad of Blue" (Lyceum Ballroom, London, England, UK, 9 December 1970)
"High Level Fugue" (Lyceum Ballroom, London, England, UK, 9 December 1970)
"Hoedown" (Mar y Sol Pop Festival, Manatí, Puerto Rico, 2 April 1972)
"Still...You Turn Me On" (Civic Center, Tulsa, Oklahoma, 7 March 1974)
"Lucky Man" (Civic Center, Tulsa, Oklahoma, 7 March 1974)
"Karn Evil 9 (1st, 2nd & 3rd Impressions)" (Anaheim Convention Center, Anaheim, California, 2 Feb 1974)

Disc 2 (The Late '70s)
"Peter Gunn Theme" (Coliseum, Wheeling, West Virginia, 18 November 1977)
"Pictures at an Exhibition" (Mid-South Coliseum, Memphis, Tennessee, 20 November 1977)
"Tiger in a Spotlight" (Coliseum, Wheeling, West Virginia, 18 November 1977)	
"Maple Leaf Rag" (Coliseum, Wheeling, West Virginia, 18 November 1977)
"Tank" (Nassau Coliseum, Uniondale, New York, 9 February 1978)	
"Drum solo" (Nassau Coliseum, Uniondale, New York, 9 February 1978)
"The Enemy God Dances with the Black Spirits" (Nassau Coliseum, Uniondale, New York, 9 February 1978)
"Watching Over You" (Coliseum, Wheeling, West Virginia, 18 November 1977)
"Pirates" (Mid-South Coliseum, Memphis, Tennessee, 20 November 1977)
"Tarkus" (Nassau Coliseum, Uniondale, New York, 9 February 1978)
"Show Me the Way to Go Home" (Mid-South Coliseum, Memphis, Tennessee, 20 November 1977)

Disc 3 (The '90s)
"Knife-Edge" (Wiltern Theater, Los Angeles, 17 March 1993)
"Paper Blood" (Obras Stadium, Buenos Aires, Argentina, 5 April 1993)
"Black Moon" (Waterloo Village Concert Field, Stanhope, New Jersey, 31 July 1992)
"Creole Dance" (Estadio, Santiago, Chile, 1 April 1993)
"From the Beginning" (Spodek, Katowice, Poland, 22 June 1997)	
"Honky Tonk Train Blues" (Universal Amphitheater, Los Angeles, California, 25 Sep 1997)
"Affairs of the Heart" (Waterloo Village Concert Field, Stanhope, New Jersey, 31 July 1992)
"Touch and Go" (Wiltern Theater, Los Angeles, California, 17 March 1993)
"A Time and a Place" (Hampton Beach Casino Ballroom, Hampton Beach, New Hampshire, 1 August 1998)	
"Bitches Crystal" (Universal Amphitheater, Los Angeles, California, 25 September 1997)
"Instrumental Jam" (Obras Stadium, Buenos Aires, Argentina, 5 April 1993)	
"Fanfare for the Common Man" – "America" – "Rondo" (Obras Stadium, Buenos Aires, Argentina, 5 Apr 1993)

Disc 4 (This Boot's for You – A Fan's View)
"Introduction" (Hollywood Bowl, Los Angeles, California, 19 July 1971)	
"The Endless Enigma" (Long Beach Arena, Long Beach, California, 28 July 1972)	
"Abaddon's Bolero" (Louisville Town Hall, Louisville, Kentucky, 21 April 1972)
"Jeremy Bender" – "The Sheriff" (Olympiahalle, Munich, Germany, 24 April 1973)
"Toccata (includes drum solo)" (Friedrich-Ebert-Halle, Ludwigshafen, Germany, 10 April 1973)	
"Jerusalem" (Henry Lewit Arena, Wichita, Kansas, 26 March 1974)
"Nut Rocker" (Boston Garden, Boston, 12 July 1977)	
"C’est la Vie" (Boston Garden, Boston, Massachusetts, 12 July 1977)
"Piano Concerto No. 1, 3rd Movement: Toccata con Fuoco" (Veterans Memorial Auditorium, Des Moines, Iowa, 12 June 1977)
"Closer to Believing" (Veterans Memorial Auditorium, Des Moines, Iowa, 12 June 1977)
"Close to Home" (Warfield Theatre, San Francisco, 14 March 1993)
"I Believe in Father Christmas" (Beacon Theatre, New York City, 17 November 1993)

Personnel

Band members 
Keith Emerson – keyboards
Greg Lake – bass, guitar, vocals
Carl Palmer – percussion, drums

Production 
Compilation Produced by: David Skye
Remastered By: Randy Wine at MoonWine Studios
Package Design: Hackmart
Artwork: William Stout
Liner Notes: Jim Allen
Project Assistance: Keith Emerson and Tony Ortiz

References

Albums produced by Greg Lake
Emerson, Lake & Palmer live albums
Shout! Factory live albums
Shout! Factory compilation albums
2010 compilation albums
2010 live albums